Monti (Gallurese: Mònti) is a comune and small town of Gallura, northern Sardinia, Italy, in the province of Sassari. The town is surrounded by the cork oak forests and vineyards which form the twin bases of its economy. The vermentino grape, once known as "arratelau", has been cultivated here since the 14th century. In 1996 its Vermentino di Gallura wine was awarded DOCG status.

Monti borders on the following communes:
 Alà dei Sardi
 Berchidda
 Calangianus
 Loiri Porto San Paolo
 Olbia
 Telti
 Su Canale

Noted Person
 Elvira Curci (1900-1984) - actress: known for: The Case Against Mrs. Ames; Alcoa Presents: One Step Beyond,('Earthquake', 1959)

References

 http://www.comunas.it/monti/
 https://web.archive.org/web/20060814213501/http://www.comune.monti.ss.it/utente/index.asp
 http://demo.istat.it/
 http://www.comuni-italiani.it/090/041/

Wine regions of Italy
Cities and towns in Sardinia